It's the End of the World as We Know It is the debut EP by American electro house musician Steve Aoki. It was released on December 11, 2012 through Dim Mak Records. The 3-track extended play includes five guest appearances from Angger Dimas, My Name Is Kay, Dan Sena, Miss Palmer, and Rune RK.

All three songs eventually became singles and were released with remixes, except for the third and last track "Transcend"; a vocal version of the song, entitled "Bring You to Life (Transcend)", featuring vocals by RAS, was released instead.

Its title is a reference to the 1987 R.E.M. song "It's the End of the World as We Know It (And I Feel Fine)."

Track listing

See also
 Dim Mak Records

References

External links
 SteveAoki.com

2012 debut EPs
Steve Aoki albums